Educational Psychology: A Century of Contributions is a book edited by Barry Zimmerman and Dale Schunk in which each chapter presents a biography of an eminent scholar whose work has had a significant influence on the field of educational psychology. It is one of the few examples of published educational psychology historiography. The book was supported by the Educational Psychology Division of the American Psychological Association (Division 15). A committee of eight educational psychologists (David Berliner, Anita Woolfolk Hoy, Richard Mayer, Wilbert J. McKeachie, Michael Pressley, Richard Snow, Claire Ellen Weinstein, and Joanna Williams) selected the following biographical subjects.

Albert Bandura  1925–2021
Alfred Binet 1857–1911
Benjamin Bloom 1913–1999
Ann Brown 1943–1999
Jerome Bruner 1915–2016
Lee Cronbach 1916–2001
John Dewey 1859–1952
Nathaniel Gage 1917–2008
Robert Gagné 1916–2002
William James 1842–1910 
Maria Montessori 1870–1952
Jean Piaget 1896–1980
Herbert A. Simon 1916–2001
Burrhus Frederic Skinner 1904–1990
Charles Spearman 1863–1945
Lewis Terman 1877–1956
Edward L. Thorndike 1874–1949
Lev Semenovich Vygotsky 1896–1934

References

Educational psychology books